The economy of Greater Oslo plays an important part in Norway's national economy.

Oslo is an important centre of maritime knowledge in Europe and is home to approximately 980 companies and 8,500 employees within the maritime sector, some of which are the world's largest shipping companies, shipbrokers, and insurance brokers. Det Norske Veritas, headquartered at Høvik outside Oslo, is one of the three major maritime classification societies in the world, with 16.5% of the world fleet to class in its register. The city's port is the largest general cargo port in the country and its leading passenger gateway. Close to 6,000 ships dock at the Port of Oslo annually with a total of 6 million tonnes of cargo and over five million passengers. The gross domestic product of Oslo totaled NOK268 billion (€34 billion) in 2003, which amounted to 17% of the national GDP. This compares with NOK166 billion (€21 billion) in 1995. The metropolitan area, bar Moss and Drammen, contributed 25% of the national GDP in 2003 and was also responsible for more than one quarter of tax revenues. In comparison, total tax revenues from the oil and gas industry on the Norwegian Continental Shelf amounted to about 16%.

Cost of living
Oslo is one of the most expensive cities in the world. As of 2006, it is ranked tenth according to the Worldwide Cost of Living Survey provided by Mercer Human Resource Consulting and first according to the Economist Intelligence Unit. The reason for this discrepancy is that the EIU omits certain factors from its final index calculation, most notably housing. Although Oslo does have the most expensive housing market in Norway, it is comparably cheaper than other cities on the list in that regard. Meanwhile, prices on goods and services remain some of the highest of any city. Oslo is hosting 2654 of the largest companies in Norway. Within the ranking of Europe's largest cities ordered by their number of companies Oslo is on position 5. A whole group of oil and gas companies is situated in Oslo. According to a report compiled by Swiss bank UBS in the month of August 2006, Oslo and London were the world's most expensive cities.

Energy
The Oslo region possesses a unique competency gained through its central role in 100 years of hydropower production and close to 40 years of offshore petroleum development.  Oslo is the main location for Norwegian research and development, and many of the institutions are clustered in the area around the University of Oslo, the largest in Northern Europe. At the University of Oslo several research groups are engaged in energy research, including work on new renewable energy sources and petroleum-related issues. Other important institutions in this field are the Norwegian Geotechnical Research Institute, Centre for International Climate and Environmental Research, the Norwegian Building Research Institute (energy efficiency, ventilation technology and indoor air quality) and the Norwegian Meteorological Institute.  The Foundation for Scientific and Industrial Research, with its 1800 employees, is the largest independent research organisation in Scandinavia. SINTEF's headquarters are in Trondheim, but it conducts extensive research activities, primarily within oil and gas exploration and production, in the Gaustadbekk Valley. Located in the heart of the Gaustadbekk Valley, the Oslo Innovation Center is the leading business incubator in the region. The park is strongly committed to the commercialisation of ideas and results from research environments through creating favourable conditions for business start-ups. The center has recently constructed an environmental technology wing to accommodate the ever-growing need for research into Renewable energy and climate-friendly technologies.

ICT

The Oslo region is in the midst of a "mobile adventure". Norwegians' desire for more efficient, entertaining and mobile ways of communication has placed them in the forefront of adapting and developing new products and services. 
Norway is among the world's leading information societies and widely regarded as having a highly developed mobile market. The Oslo region is a key driver and centre for research, development and business. A combination of unique expertise, strong R&D environments and advanced users with high purchasing power has made the Oslo region an excellent test market for new and innovative ICT products. Recent years have witnessed a large number of business start-ups in the region, and several internationally renowned companies have chosen to locate here such as Google Inc and Microsoft Norway.  The Norwegian topography naturally lends itself to mobile communication with its vast and practically impenetrable mountainous areas and plateaus—factors which have made Norway a pioneer in new communication techniques and advanced technologies. Norwegian research contribution was crucial when the world's first automatic mobile net NMT 450 was launched in 1981, and today's global GSM-standard was invented in Norway by Telenor. Many promising companies are contributing to the growing mobile and wireless cluster in Oslo. Wireless Future (Trådløs Fremtid) is established as a cluster building initiative, involving most of the key players from business and R&D in Norway. Tandberg is known for its video conference systems and the Kongsberg Group has developed a wide spectrum of technological products for the defence and maritime industry. The list of companies with international success are rising, with prime examples like Opera Software, the game producer Funcom and Chipcon, which in 2006 was sold to Texas Instruments. FAST, which has become a global market leader in search engineers, has been appointed a Norwegian Centre for Research-based Innovation (SFI) thanks to its Information Access.

Telenor, Norway's largest ICT-company, with head office located at Fornebu, just outside Oslo is emerging as one of the fastest growing providers of mobile communications services worldwide. In 2007, Telenor surpassed 136 million mobile subscriptions worldwide, placing it as the 7th largest mobile operator in the world. The Telenor Group was ranked the best Mobile Telecom company in the world by the Sustainability Yearbook 2008. With the Department of Informatics, the University of Oslo is the largest educational institution for ICT within the region. Together with the Norwegian Computing Center and SINTEF, the Department of Informatics provides Norway with an important research environment for ICT. Other renowned R&D environments are found at Fornebu, Kjeller, Halden and Horten.

Maritime
Norway's maritime industry is built on the expertise gained from centuries as a shipping nation, with Oslo at the main centre. Maritime companies locate in Oslo to be part of a complete and innovative cluster of shipping companies and a range of specialized maritime services. For investors and partners, the strength and the international position of the maritime cluster in Oslo offers many attractive opportunities. In a special report on Oslo from November 12, 2008, Lloyd's List highlights the diversity and strength of the Oslo maritime cluster. According to Lloyd's, "Oslo remains Norway's largest hub for international shipping and related industries with a range of businesses from shipping to financial services and maritime research, with few rivals worldwide". Though Norway is still feeling the repercussions of a long tax debate, Lloyd's characterizes the concentration of shipowners based in the Norwegian capital as "impressive". With the advent of a favourable shipping tax, Oslo shipowners together with leading service companies have turned their attention to developing high-tech and environmentally friendly solutions for the industry. Leading classification society Det Norske Veritas (DNV) is a major contributor to these developments, with a range of research initiatives connected to green shipping, safety and the environment. The financial sector in Oslo continues to support industry activity, with Oslo Børs and Imarex trading shipping shares and freight derivatives, maritime banking giants DnB NOR and Nordea, and leading brokerage houses like Fearnlys, Pareto and RS Platou. Oslo Maritime Network (OMN) is a non-profit collaborative network organisation gathering members from all segments of the maritime cluster in Norway's capital region.

Research

In 2004, the Oslo region was ranked six on innovation in a comparison with the regions of the European Union. The Oslo region gets top scores on lifelong learning, working population with tertiary education and public R&D expenses per capita. But it is also among Europe’s most developed regions in relation to high-tech employment and innovation co-operation in medium-sized enterprises.

At the national level, the 2005 European Innovation Scoreboard shows that Norway is one of the most innovative countries in Europe in relation to the most innovative sectors, i.e. business services and computer and related activities. The knowledge environment in the Oslo region is the force behind an international level of R&D in a number of specialist areas. With short distances and a transparent community, it is easy to develop interdisciplinary collaboration. The University of Oslo holds four Nobel Prizes and is the largest knowledge institution in the region, with 30 000 students and 4 600 employees. It is located at Gaustad/Blindern, the prime location for R&D in the city of Oslo. Other R&D hubs in the region are found at Ås, Kjeller, Kongsberg, Fornebu, Horten and Halden. Cost-saving technology is a top priority for Norwegian businesses and Norwegians are quick to pick up new and innovative technological products and ideas, and use them in their daily lives. The European Innovation Scoreboard 2003 puts Norway second after Denmark on its innovation take-up barometer. Norwegians use on average only four years to start using new technologies and Norway in general and the Oslo region in particular are excellent test-beds for new innovative technological products and ideas. The Oslo region has seen a strong growth of actors in the regional innovation support system in recent years. The regional innovation support system is made up of 23 different actors, including technology transfer offices, science parks, business incubators, venture capitalists and a range of other companies and programmes providing support and assistance in the process of commercialising research based ideas and helping entrepreneurs developing their businesses into the international market place.

See also
Economy of Norway

References